Robert J. Abernethy (born February 28, 1940) is an American entrepreneur and philanthropist based in Manhattan Beach, California. He is the founder and president of both American Standard Development Company and Self Storage Management Company.

Early life, family, education
Abernethy was born in Indianapolis, Indiana and raised in Davidson, North Carolina. Abernethy attended Johns Hopkins University, where he served as the Student Body President. Also while attending Johns Hopkins, Abernethy gained membership to the Johns Hopkins University chapter of Omicron Delta Kappa, and to Eta Kappa Nu, the honor society for the Institute of Electrical Engineers. He received a B.A. in Mathematics & Electrical Engineering from Johns Hopkins University in 1962. Abernethy attended Harvard Business School, where he took classes taught by Henry Kissinger, Thomas Schelling and J. Ronald Fox. Abernethy graduated with an M.B.A. in 1968. Abernethy completed further postgraduate work at UCLA, where he received a certificate in Construction Management in 1973 and a certificate in Real Estate in 1974.

Abernethy's mother, Helen, was an artist and taught Art History at Davidson College. His father George was a professor at Davidson, and founded the Davidson College Department of Philosophy. Abernethy has one younger sister, Jean Helen Poston.

Military service
From 1963 to 1966, Abernethy served in the United States Navy as a Supply Corps Officer. Upon returning from his tour, Abernethy became an Operations Officer of the data processing department of the Naval Aircraft Overhaul & Repair Facility at Quonset Point, Rhode Island. Abernethy studied tactical data systems and NORAD at the Cheyenne Mountain Complex.

Career
After Harvard Business School, Abernethy worked for the Hughes Aircraft Company (from 1972 to 1974), which promoted him to Controller for the Technology Division. Prior to his promotion, he worked on developmental aerospace projects such as the AIM-54 Phoenix Missile Program and the Iroquois Night Fighter & Night Tracker Program. In 1974, Abernethy left Hughes Aircraft and started two companies, American Standard Development Company and Self Storage Management Company. The latter develops and manages industrial parks, incubators, and mini storage facilities throughout Southern California. Abernethy served as vice president, Secretary, and Treasurer of the National Self Storage Service Association from 1978 to 1986. He also served on Public Storage’s Board of Directors from 1980 to 2007. In 2009, Abernethy was inducted into the Self Storage Association's "Hall of Fame."

Public service

Abernethy served as a Commissioner on the City of Los Angeles Planning and Zoning Commission from 1984 to 1988, a Director of the Metropolitan Water District of Southern California Board of Directors from 1988 to 1993, a Commissioner on the City of Los Angeles Telecommunications Commission from 1992 to 1993, a Director of the Los Angeles County Metropolitan Transportation Authority from 1995 to 1998, a Commissioner of the California Transportation Commission from 1999 to 2000, a member of the California State Board of Education from 2000 to 2004, and a member of the California Arts Council from 2001 to 2004.

Educational organizations

Abernethy is a Trustee Emeritus of Johns Hopkins University, where he serves on Advisory Boards for the Paul H. Nitze School of Advanced International Studies (SAIS), SAIS Europe, and the Bloomberg School of Public Health. He has also served on the advisory board of the Peabody Institute and the Center for Talented Youth. Since 1993, Abernethy has served on Davidson College's Board of Visitors.

In the Los Angeles area, he serves as a Trustee of Loyola Marymount University. He sits on the UCLA Luskin School of Public Affairs Board of Advisors, the UCLA Health Advisory Board and the UCLA School of the Arts and Architecture Board of Visitors.

Abernethy formerly served as a Trustee of Davidson College and Johns Hopkins University, where he sat on the advisory board of the Peabody Institute and the Center for Talented Youth. From 1980 to 1990, Abernethy served as Chairman of the Harvard Business School Scholarship Trust.

Public policy and political activity

Abernethy serves as Vice Chairman of the Atlantic Council and as a trustee of the Brookings Institution. He is a Director of the Truman Center for National Policy, the International Refugee Assistance Project, and the Los Angeles World Affairs Council. Additionally, he is a member of the board of Integrity Initiatives International. Abernethy has advisory roles at the United States Institute of Peace  and the RAND Corporation Center for Global Risk and Security. Abernethy serves on the US Department of State Advisory Committee on International Economic Policy Sanctions Subcommittee.

He is a member of the Aspen Institute Society of Fellows, the Chairman's Forum of the Council on Foreign Relations, the California Committee South of Human Rights Watch, and the Synergos Global Philanthropists Circle. He was a Director of  TechNet and the Pacific Council on International Policy. From 1986 to 2000, Abernethy was Chairman of the Center for the Study of Democratic Institutions. Abernethy is a member of the Meridian Board of Trustees.

Abernethy serves as a Director of the New Leaders Council, Associate Publisher to Democracy: A Journal of Ideas, and a Foreign Policy Advisor to the Center for American Progress. He is a Trustee of the New Democrat Network and the Progressive Policy Institute. Previously, Abernethy was a Trustee of the Democratic Leadership Council and an Advisor to Blueprint Magazine.

Philanthropy and cultural institutions

Abernethy was Vice Chair of the Los Angeles Music Center. He serves as a Director of the YMCA of Metropolitan Los Angeles. Since 1978, Abernethy has sat on the Board of Managers of the Westchester Family YMCA. In 2019, The YMCA of Metropolitan Los Angeles awarded Abernethy the Golden Book Award for distinguished service. Abernethy serves as a director of the William H. Parker Los Angeles Police Foundation. Previously, Abernethy was a board member of the Civic Light Opera of South Bay Cities, and served as a Director of the Hollywood Bowl, the Los Angeles Philharmonic, and the Los Angeles Theatre Center.

Abernethy supports healthcare research, serving as a Director of the Albert Schweitzer Fellowship and the John Douglas French Alzheimer's Foundation. He also serves on the Advisory Boards of the Massachusetts General Hospital Center for Surgery, Innovation & Bioengineering, the Ronald Reagan UCLA Medical Center, and the UCLA Health System.

References

1940 births
Atlantic Council
Living people
Businesspeople from Indiana
Businesspeople from North Carolina
Johns Hopkins University alumni
Harvard Business School alumni
People from Davidson, North Carolina
New America (organization)